The 2005 Giro d'Italia was the 88th edition of the Giro d'Italia, one of cycling's Grand Tours. The field consisted of 197 riders, and 153 riders finished the race.

By rider

By nationality

References

2005 Giro d'Italia
2005